Donte Jackson may refer to:

Donte Jackson (American football) (born 1995), American football cornerback
Donte Jackson (basketball) (born 1979), American basketball coach